Eli Cohen, nickname: "The Sheriff", born 3 January 1951) is a former Israeli football player and manager.

Soccer career
Between 1968 and 1986 he was a player with Maccabi Ramat Amidar and Shimshon Tel Aviv, and earned a gold medal playing for Team Israel at the 1977 Maccabiah Games. He has managed numerous clubs, including Bnei Yehuda, Maccabi Tel Aviv, Beitar Jerusalem, Hapoel Tel Aviv, Maccabi Ramat Amidar,  Hapoel Hadera, Maccabi Herzliya, Ironi Rishon leZion, Hapoel Petah Tikva, Maccabi Netanya, Hapoel Be'er Sheva, Ironi Kiryat Shmona, Ironi Modi'in, and Maccabi Haifa . He won a championship with Beitar Jerusalem in the 1996-97 season.

Honours

As a manager
 Israeli Second Division (1):
 1992-93
 Israeli Championships (1):
 1996–97
 Israel State Cup (1):
 1999

See also
 List of Maccabi Haifa F.C. managers

References

1951 births
Living people
Competitors at the 1977 Maccabiah Games
Israeli Jews
Israeli footballers
Maccabiah Games gold medalists for Israel
Maccabiah Games medalists in football
Maccabi Ramat Amidar F.C. players
Shimshon Tel Aviv F.C. players
Israeli football managers
Maccabi Ramat Amidar F.C. managers
Hapoel Hadera F.C. managers
Maccabi Herzliya F.C. managers
Hapoel Rishon LeZion F.C. managers
Beitar Jerusalem F.C. managers
Hapoel Tel Aviv F.C. managers
Maccabi Haifa F.C. managers
Hapoel Petah Tikva F.C. managers
Maccabi Netanya F.C. managers
Hapoel Be'er Sheva F.C. managers
Maccabi Tel Aviv F.C. managers
Bnei Yehuda Tel Aviv F.C. managers
Hapoel Ironi Kiryat Shmona F.C. managers
Israeli Premier League managers
Association football defenders